The 1998 Prokom Polish Open was a women's tennis tournament played on outdoor clay courts in Sopot, Poland that was part of the Tier IV category of the 1998 WTA Tour. It was the inaugural edition of the tournament and was held from 27 July until 2 August 1998. First-seeded Henrieta Nagyová won the singles title and earned $17,700 first-prize money.

Finals

Singles

 Henrieta Nagyová defeated  Elena Wagner 6–3, 5–7, 6–1
 It was Nagyová's 1st title of the year and the 4th of her career.

Doubles

 Květa Hrdličková /  Helena Vildová defeated  Åsa Carlsson /  Seda Noorlander 6–3, 6–2
 It was Hrdličková's 2nd title of the year and the 2nd of her career. It was Vildova's only title of the year and the 3rd of her career.

References

External links
 ITF tournament edition details
 Tournament draws

Prokom Polish Open
Orange Warsaw Open
Orange